Hamrin is a surname. Notable people with the surname include:

 Felix Hamrin (1875–1937), Swedish Liberal politician, briefly Prime Minister in 1932 
 Jan Hamrin
 Kurt Hamrin (born 1934), Swedish footballer
 Midde Hamrin (born 1957), Swedish long-distance runner
 Sven Hamrin (born 1941), Swedish cyclist
 Ulf Hamrin (born 1946), Swedish writer